The United Kingdom of Great Britain and Northern Ireland competed at the 2014 Winter Paralympics in Sochi, Russia, held between 7–16 of March 2014. The team was known by it shortened name of Great Britain, for identification purposes.

Great Britain fielded a total of 12 athletes; a team of five in wheelchair curling, and seven athletes in alpine skiing. The three visually impaired skiers competed with a sighted guide, taking the total number of competitors for Great Britain to fifteen.

The 2014 Winter Paralympic Games were the most successful ever for Great Britain, as they won their first gold medal. They also won their largest number of medals at a Winter Paralympics since 1984.

On 9 March 2014 Jade Etherington, with guide Caroline Powell, won silver in the women's visually impaired downhill. On 10 March 2014, they won bronze in the women's visually impaired Super-G. In the same event, Kelly Gallagher and her guide Charlotte Evans won the gold medal, the first for Great Britain at a Winter Paralympics.

On 12 March 2014 Jade Etherington and guide Caroline Powell won another silver in the Women's visually impaired slalom. They won a third silver medal in the Women's combined on 14 March 2014, making them the most successful GB Winter Paralympians. It also meant ParalympicsGB met the high end of the Alpine Skiing target of five medals.

On 15 March 2014 the wheelchair curling team won the bronze medal match, beating China 7-3. They had qualified for the playoff rounds in fourth place, losing to China 6-3 in the final match. They lost to Russia 13-4 in the semifinals. The result meant ParalympicsGB met their performance target for wheelchair curling.

Medallists

Medal and performance targets
On 16 January 2014, the funding body UK Sport announced their medal targets for ParalympicsGB at the 2014 Winter Paralympic Games in Sochi. The target was set at two medals; although the funding body predicted that Great Britain had the potential to win as many as six medals, this total was not widely expected to be reached. On 15 March, the penultimate day of the Games, that 6 medal 'stretch target'  was nonetheless achieved, following the success of the wheelchair curling team in its bronze medal match against China.

UK Sport funding
In the Winter Paralympic Cycle running from 2010 to 2014 the UK government body UK Sport allocated a budget of over three quarters of a million to fund ParalympicsGB for the individual athletes as well as the wheelchair curling team for the 2014 Winter Paralympics in Sochi.

Alpine skiing

Britain’s alpine skiing team consisted of seven competitors. In the visually impaired categories Kelly Gallagher, Jade Etherington and Millie Knight represented Britain, racing with their respective guides, Charlotte Evans, Caroline Powell and Rachael Ferrier.

Great Britain was represented in the sit-skiing category by Mick Brennan, Ben Sneesby and Anna Turney, while James Whitley was the sole British competitor in the standing events.

Women

Men

Wheelchair curling

In wheelchair curling, Great Britain's team was Aileen Neilson, Jim Gault, Gregor Ewan, Bob McPherson and Angie Malone.
Tom Killin was initially named in the squad, but had to be replaced by Jim Gault just before the start of the competition, as an illness meant doctors advised him not to travel.

Round Robin

Standings

Results
Great Britain had a bye in draws 2, 5 and 10.

Draw 1

Draw 3

Draw 4

Draw 6

Draw 7

Draw 8

Draw 9

Draw 11

Draw 12

Playoffs

Semifinal

Bronze-medal game

See also
 Great Britain at the 2014 Winter Olympics

References

External links
International Paralympic Committee official website

Nations at the 2014 Winter Paralympics
2014
Paralympics
Winter sports in the United Kingdom